Howard Christian Naffziger (1884–1961) was a reputed U.S. neurosurgeon, noted for his invention of the orbital decompression procedure, to alleviate intraocular pressure (that occurs in, e.g., goiter).

Christian Jacob Naffziger had immigrated to the United States from Bavaria and settled in Nevada City, California, after a stint as a farmer in Illinois. He met and married Lizzie Scott Naffziger, with whom he had three children. Only one, Howard Christian Naffziger, born on May 6, 1884, survived into adulthood. Howard Christian Naffziger graduated at the top of his Nevada City High School class, and took one more year of secondary education at Berkeley High School. He enrolled at UC Berkeley in 1902, but dropped out to work at the Culbertson Mine, because his father died of a heart attack, and Howard was expected to earn some money for his family. He returned to school in 1904, and earned a medical degree in 1909.

Naffziger interned at the UCSF Medical Center, and was a resident a Johns Hopkins University Hospital. After one year, he returned to San Francisco, set up his own surgical operation, and began teaching at the University of California Medical School. Naffziger's private practice was interrupted by World War I, during which he served at the Letterman Army Hospital. He rejoined the medical school after the war, and was responsible for founding the Department of Neuroscience, which he led until retirement in 1952. In retirement, Naffziger served on the board of regents for the University of California System. Naffziger, who had begun consulting the government on medical issues during World War II as a member of the National Research Council, continued as an adviser for the Surgeon General until his death in San Francisco on March 21, 1961.

He married Louise McNear in 1919, and had three children, Marion, Jean Louise and Elizabeth. Marion married William Horsley Orrick Jr., Jean Louise married Nicholas G. Thacher. and Elizabeth married W. Eugene Stern, M.D. who had been trained in neurosurgery by Dr. Naffziger at UCSF.

References

Further reading
Howard C. Naffziger archival collection at UCSF

American neurosurgeons
1884 births
1961 deaths
People from Nevada City, California
University of California, Berkeley alumni
University of California, San Francisco faculty
American military personnel of World War I
American people of German descent
Bavarian emigrants to the United States
Military personnel from California
Physicians from California
20th-century surgeons